The 1914 Oklahoma gubernatorial election was held on November 3, 1914, and was a race for Governor of Oklahoma. Democrat Robert L. Williams defeated Republican John Fields and Socialist Fred W. Holt.  Also on the ballot were Independents Amos L. Wilson and T. J. Wood as well as Progressive Party nominee John P. Hickman. The Prohibition Party also had ballot access but did not run a candidate for governor.

Democratic primary
Oklahoma Supreme Court chief justice Robert L. Williams stepped down from that post to run for governor, defeating five other candidates including James B. A. Robertson who would succeed him four years later.

Primary Results

Results

References

1914
Gubernatorial
Okla